Carniella brignolii is a tangle web spider species found in Belgium, Switzerland, Germany and Austria.

See also 
 List of Theridiidae species

References 

Theridiidae
Spiders of Europe
Spiders described in 1988